The 1976 NCAA Division III men's basketball tournament was the second annual single-elimination tournament to determine the men's collegiate basketball national champion of National Collegiate Athletic Association (NCAA) Division III, held during March 1976.

The tournament field included 28 teams, a decrease of two from 1975, and the national championship rounds were contested in Reading, Pennsylvania.

Scranton defeated Wittenberg, 60–57 (in overtime), to win their first national championship.

Regional Rounds

Regional No. 1

Regional No. 2

Regional No. 3

Regional No. 4

Regional No. 5

Regional No. 6

Regional Midwest - Rock Island, Illinois

Championship Rounds
Site: Reading, Pennsylvania

See also
1976 NCAA Division I basketball tournament
1976 NCAA Division II basketball tournament
1976 NAIA Basketball Tournament

References

NCAA Division III men's basketball tournament
Ncaa Tournament
NCAA Division III men's basketball tournament
NCAA Division III basketball tournament